The Naruto manga is written by Masashi Kishimoto and published by Shueisha in Weekly Shōnen Jump. The series focuses on titular hero and protagonist named Naruto Uzumaki, a ninja from the Hidden Leaf Village with supernatural ninjutsu abilities, who is the host of Nine Tailed Fox and dreams to become Hokage in order to receive respect from the villagers and to protect them from any upcoming threats. The series began its serialization in the issue 43 from 1999. Shueisha later collected these chapters in tankōbon bound volumes. The first 244 chapters are known as Part I, and constitute the first part of the Naruto storyline. All subsequent chapters belong to Part II, which continues the storyline from Part I after a two and a half year ellipsis. Viz Media licenses the Naruto manga for an English adaptation in North America, where it is serialized in the American Shonen Jump and released in volume format.

Several adaptations based on Naruto have been made, including two anime series and seven feature films. The first anime series, also titled Naruto, covers the entirety of Part I over 220 episodes. The second, named , is based on Part II. Both series are produced by Studio Pierrot and TV Tokyo, and air on TV Tokyo.

Shueisha has released 72 tankōbon in Japan, with the first 27 containing Part I, and the remaining 45 belonging to Part II. The first tankōbon was released on March 3, 2000, and the latest volume 72 was released on February 4, 2015. Additionally, from November 7, 2008 through April 10, 2009, Shueisha reprinted the entirety of Part I in a nine-volume sōshūhen set titled .

Viz Media has released 72 volumes of the English adaptation of the manga, with volume 1 released on August 6, 2003, and volume 72 released on October 6, 2015. In order to compensate for the gap between the Japanese and English adaptations of the manga, Viz announced its "Naruto Nation" campaign, where it would release three volumes each month in the last four months of 2007 in order to close said gap. A similar campaign happened in 2009, entitled "Generation Ninja," with eleven volumes from Part II of the series to be released between February and April of that year in order to catch up to the Japanese serialization. Starting with the release of volume 45 in July 2009, Viz began to release Naruto volumes on a quarterly basis.

Volume list

Part I

Part I covers the first 244 chapters of the Naruto manga and is contained in 27 tankōbon volumes. All 27 tankōbon have been released in Japan by Shueisha and in North America by Viz Media. Viz released volumes 16 through 27 over a four-month period as part of the "Naruto Nation" campaign, meant to close the gap between the Japanese and English versions of the manga.

Part II
The second half of the Naruto storyline, known as Part II, encapsulates all the chapters following chapter 244; specifically chapters 245-700, and is set two and a half years after the end of the Part I storyline. The English adaptation of Part II serialization in the American Shonen Jump on December 4, 2007, and the first volume was released on March 4, 2008. To catch up with the Japanese serialization, Viz Media released eleven volumes from Part II between February and April 2009, after which it began releasing Naruto on a quarterly basis.

Volumes 28–48

Volumes 49–72

References

External links
 Official Viz Media Naruto site

fr:Liste des chapitres de Naruto